Kachehri is a 1994 Punjabi language film starring Gurdas Maan, Surinder Shinda and Chetana Das.
The playback is by Jaspinder Narula, Sadhana Sargam, Salma Agha and Gurdas Maan.

References

External links

1994 films
Punjabi-language Indian films
1990s Punjabi-language films
Best Punjabi Feature Film National Film Award winners